Etlingera metriocheilos is a monocotyledonous plant species that was first described by William Griffiths, and got its current name by Rosemary Margaret Smith. Etlingera metriocheilos is part of the genus Etlingera and the family Zingiberaceae. No subspecies are listed in the Catalog of Life.

References 

metriocheilos
Taxa named by Rosemary Margaret Smith